Stanley Smith (1903 – 1974) was a film actor and singer. He had leading roles opposite various other stars and featured in several musicals.

He was born in Kansas City. He co-starred opposite Clara Bow in Love Among the Millionaires. He married Mary Lawlor in the finale of Good News. He signed with Paramount Pictures.

Filmography
 The Sophomore (1929)
Sweetie (1929)
Honey (1930)Paramount on Parade (1930)Love Among the Millionaires (1930)King of Jazz (1930)Soup to Nuts (1930), the original film featuring the Three StoogesFollow the Leader (1930)Good News (1930)Queen High (1930)Hot Saturday (1932)Stepping Sisters (1932)Hard to Handle (1933), vocalist in the bandReform Girl'' (1933)

References

External links
 
 

1903 births
1974 deaths
American male film actors
Male actors from Kansas City, Kansas